Jean-Christophe Bette (born 3 December 1977 in Saint-Germain-en-Laye) is a French competition rower and Olympic champion.

Bette won a gold medal in lightweight coxless four at the 2000 Summer Olympics.

References

Sportspeople from Saint-Germain-en-Laye
1977 births
French male rowers
Olympic rowers of France
Rowers at the 2000 Summer Olympics
Rowers at the 2008 Summer Olympics
Olympic gold medalists for France
Living people
Olympic medalists in rowing
European champions for France
World Rowing Championships medalists for France
Medalists at the 2000 Summer Olympics
Mediterranean Games gold medalists for France
Mediterranean Games medalists in rowing
Competitors at the 2005 Mediterranean Games
European Rowing Championships medalists
20th-century French people
21st-century French people